Kolbandre is a small village in Ratnagiri district, Maharashtra state in Western India. The 2011 Census of India recorded a total of 1,696 residents. The village is 1,365.78 hectares in size.

See also
 Dapoli

References

Villages in Ratnagiri district